Crooked Hill is a neighborhood in Susquehanna Township, Dauphin County, Pennsylvania, and is a suburb of the city of Harrisburg, Pennsylvania.  The name Crooked Hill is derived from  Crooked Hill Road, which has many different neighborhoods located along it.

Geography of Dauphin County, Pennsylvania